This is a list of churches throughout Pakistan, at present. It is a dynamic list, in alphabetical order by names of cities/towns etc. and can be added to as per the accepted format below.

Abbottabad
 The Presbyterian Church of Pakistan. The Mall, Abbottabad
 St. Luke's Church, Abbottabad

Rawalpindi
 St. Paul's Church, Rawalpindi
 Christ Church Rawalpindi

Bannu
 St. George's Church
 Bannu Roman Catholic Church

Battagram
 Emmanuel Church, Battagram

Dera Ismail Khan
 Saint Thomas' Church, Dera Ismail Khan

Faisalabad
 Cathedral of Sts. Peter and Paul

Hyderabad

 St. Francis Xavier Cathedral

Islamabad
Zamar Pentecostal Church Islamabad (Pentecostal)
 Church of Jesus Christ of Latter-day Saints (Mormon)
Assemblies of God Church, Islamabad PS Samson John)
United Protestant Church of Pakistan; Bishop Dr. Emanuel Khokhar, Ph. D

Karachi
Holy Trinity Cathedral
 Our Lady of Fatima Church
 Sacred Heart Church, Keamari
 St. Andrew's Church, also known as Scotch Church
 St. Anthony's Church, Cantt
 St. Francis' Church, Haji Camp
 St. Jude's Church
 St. Lawrence's Church
 St. Patrick's Cathedral
 St. Paul's Church, Manora
 Saint Patrick's Cathedral, Karachi

Lahore
 Sacred Heart Cathedral on The Mall Road 
 St. Andrew's Church
 St. Andrew's Presbyterian Church on Nabha Road
 St. Anthony's Church, The Mall
 St. Joseph's Church 
 St. Mary's Church
 Cathedral Church of Resurrection
 Samaritan's Fellowship Church
 St. Marqas Pentecostal Church, Bilal Town, Raiwind Road, Lahore

Multan
 Cathedral of the Holy Redeemer
 Jesus Is The Answer Church Ministries Pakistan

Nathia Gali
 St. Matthew's Church, Nathia Gali - seasonal only (see St.Luke's Church, Abbottabad, above)

Peshawar
 All Saints Church
 St. John's Church (now called St John's Cathedral) 
 St Michael's Church

Sialkot
 Sialkot Cathedral
 Assemblies of God Church

Thandiani
St. Xavier in the Wilderness - seasonal only (see St.Luke's Church, Abbottabad, above)

References

External links
 Cathedrals in Pakistan

 
Religious buildings and structures in Pakistan
Pakistan
churches